Love Is for Suckers is the fifth studio album by the American heavy metal band Twisted Sister. It was released by Atlantic Records in July 1987, with the single "Hot Love" being released on August 1. It was the band's last album before their breakup and subsequent reunion and release of Still Hungry in 2004. It is also their last album to be composed of entirely new, original material.

Overview
The sound of the album was strongly influenced by glam metal, and was one of the causes of conflict which led to the band splitting after its release. The band got rid of the more extreme elements of their look, to "fit in with every other hair metal band out there at that time". According to interviews contained in the Live at Wacken DVD and in Snider's autobiography, the material was originally meant to be a solo album by Twisted Sister's lead singer, Dee Snider, but the label pushed for it to be released under the Twisted Sister name instead. The tour for the album lasted just over one month and ended in Minneapolis, Minnesota on October 10, 1987. Two days later, on October 12, 1987, vocalist Dee Snider announced his departure from the band.

All the original band members recorded this album, except drummer A. J. Pero. Pero played on all previous Twisted Sister albums and left the band in July 1986, though he came back for some reunion tours and special recordings. He was replaced for a short time by Joey Franco.

No songs from this album appeared on the band's 1992 greatest hits album Big Hits and Nasty Cuts. It would be Twisted Sister's final studio album of original material, as all albums since have been compilations, live albums or re-recordings of already written material.

Seven of the album's songs were played live during the brief 1987 tour. Snider has stated that he likes many of the songs on the album, vocally. However he feels that if they play any of them live, it may bring back bad memories for the band. In 2012, the band introduced "Wake Up (The Sleeping Giant)" into their set, following demands from fans for material to be included from all of the band's studio albums.

In a 1987 interview with Record Mirror, Snider stated, "We haven't done many love songs before. Most of our songs have been about rebellion, but on Love Is for Suckers the songs are mainly about love, lust and sex. It's a very horny album. I get pretty excited every time I hear it."

In a 2009 interview by Ruben Mosqueda, Snider spoke of his thoughts on the album: 

In 2012, Dee Snider commented to an audience at the annual concert festival in Dessel Belgium, known as the Graspop Metal Meeting, "Now we have been accused in the past of not playing stuff from all of our albums, so this year we added one song from the Love Is for Suckers record to the set [...] for those who know in the 80s, there was a little problem in Washington with censorship and this one was a big middle finger to Washington D.C. It's called "Wake Up (the Sleeping Giant)."" The band then performed that song.

Critical reception

Upon its release, Billboard wrote: "Longtime New York-based rockers stumbled with last release but have managed to catch their balance on this one, with a new producer and new attitude. Album is chock-full of sturdy, straightforward cuts." Sharon Liveten of the Los Angeles Times wrote: "On its fifth album, Twisted Sister doesn't tromp off into uncharted territory. It's anthemic, occasionally repetitive and self-derivative. That said, Love Is for Suckers is a darned good album. The guitar work is flashy but doesn't resort to clichéd posturing and Dee Snider's vocals are in fine, sneering form."

Robin Welles of The Press-Courier described Love Is for Suckers as "a screamer of an album". Pete Bishop of the Pittsburgh Press commented: "This is cliche-cluttered, "commercial" heavy metal designed for instant acceptance. Seven of the cuts are the same wham-bam-party-hearty stuff Twisted Sister and so many others have defrosted and reheated ad nauseam." He selected "Hot Love", "One Bad Habit" and "You Are All That I Need" as "the class of the disc because they dare to differ from the formula and because Twisted Sister performs them well."

Michael Dowding of The Boston Globe wrote: "Unfortunately, this album sounds like a band in decline. There's still enough thump and screech to keep the Saturday night party going, but don't look for any development or innovation. For fans, the best cuts include "Wake Up" and "One Bad Habit". For many other listeners, though, this is an album to avoid." Barbara Jaeger of The Record wrote: "The 10 songs on this collection sound like every other song the band has done. Underscoring the overwrought vocals of Dee Snider are screechy guitars and thunderous drums. The songs, with their sophomoric lyrics, cover the usual heavy-metal topics. So, if you're looking for something new, forget about this one." Keith Carman from Exclaim!, gave the album a highly negative review, stating, "This isn't even for suckers; it just sucks."

Track listing

Note: the reissue bonus tracks were later released as a separate EP in 2021 titled: Feel Appeal: Love Is for Suckers Extras.

Personnel

Twisted Sister
Dee Snider – lead vocals
Eddie "Fingers" Ojeda - lead & rhythm guitar, backing vocals
Jay Jay French - rhythm & lead guitar, backing vocals
Mark "The Animal" Mendoza – bass, backing vocals
Joey "Seven" Franco – drums, percussion

Additional musicians
Reb Beach – additional guitars, additional shouts
Beau Hill – keyboards, backing vocals
The New West Horns – horns
Jimmy Chalfant, Steve Whiteman, Kip Winger – backing vocals
Bob Gamm, Gary Kris, B. Smith, Chris Cintron, Joe Gerber, Jodie Segall, Peter Love, Luke Perry - additional shouts

Production
Beau Hill - producer, engineer
Twisted Sister, Beau Hill, Reb Beach, Ronni Le Tekrø - arrangements
Stephen Benben - engineer
Ira McLaughlin - assistant engineer
Ted Jensen - mastering at Sterling Sound, New York
Bob Defrin - art direction
Frank Moscati - photography
Dee Snider - cover concept

Charts

Album

Singles

References

Twisted Sister albums
1987 albums
Atlantic Records albums
Albums produced by Beau Hill